Big Lake Airport  is a state-owned public-use airport located one nautical mile (1.8 km) southeast of the central business district of Big Lake, in the Matanuska-Susitna Borough of the U.S. state of Alaska.

Facilities and aircraft 
Big Lake Airport has one runway (7/25) with a gravel surface measuring 2,435 by 70 feet (742 x 21 m). For the 12-month period ending December 31, 2005, the airport had 20,000 aircraft operations, an average of 54 per day, all of which were general aviation. At that time there were 79 aircraft based at this airport: 95% single-engine, 4% ultralight and 1% helicopter.

References

External links 
 FAA Alaska airport diagram (GIF)
 

Airports in Matanuska-Susitna Borough, Alaska